The men's hammer throw event at the 2014 Asian Games was held at the Incheon Asiad Main Stadium, Incheon, South Korea on 27 September.

Schedule
All times are Korea Standard Time (UTC+09:00)

Records

Results 
Legend
NM — No mark

References

Results

Hammer throw men
2014 men